South Carolina Highway 357 (SC 357) is a  state highway that travels from Greer to Campobello through some of the rural parts of western Spartanburg County, South Carolina.

Route description
SC 357 begins at an intersection with SC 290 (East Poinsett Street) and SC 101 (South Line Street) in Greer, and is named North Line Street until it intersects Arlington Avenue. At that point, road name changes to Arlington Road, and then intersects U.S. Route 29 (US 29; East Wade Hampton Boulevard). From there, it goes down into unincorporated Apalache, where it turns to the east, crosses the South Tyger River, and then continues solely as SC 357. It intersects Gap Creek Road, and leaves Greer to enter Lyman, South Carolina. Once SC 357 enters Lyman, it crosses the Middle Tyger River and goes on for a few miles until it crosses SC 358, where SC 357 turns to the north and continues off of SC 358's terminus. SC 357 goes through some rural parts of Spartanburg County, which last until it reaches Campobello, South Carolina. Once the route enters Campobello, it intersects US 176 (North Main Street), which is its northern terminus.

History

Major intersections

See also

References

External links

SC 357 South Carolina Hwy Index

Transportation in Spartanburg County, South Carolina
357